Stephen T. Denker is a retired United States Air Force major general who now is a vice president at Lockheed Martin. In the U.S. Air Force, he last served as the deputy director of the National Reconnaissance Office.

References

External links
 

Year of birth missing (living people)
Living people
Place of birth missing (living people)
United States Air Force generals